Do Not Fold, Spindle or Mutilate is a 1971 American made-for-television mystery film directed by Ted Post, starring Myrna Loy, Helen Hayes, Mildred Natwick, Sylvia Sidney, John Beradino and Vince Edwards, with the screenplay adapted by John D. F. Black from a novel of the same name by Doris Miles Disney. It was broadcast as the ABC Movie of the Week on November 9, 1971.

Plot
Four middle-class Pasadena ladies in their late sixties (Helen Hayes, Myrna Loy, Mildred Natwick and Sylvia Sidney) habitually meet for lunch and exchange small talk with their waitress (Dodo Denney). They propose to create a fictitious young woman named Rebecca, and to submit her profile to a computer dating service. Several days after doing so they begin to receive letters from potential suitors, and derive additional amusement from reading them out loud.

Concurrently, a young woman (Diane Shalet) becomes alarmed by her date Mal's (Vince Edwards) attempts to force himself upon her, and manages to escape into her home. His audible thoughts reveal that he has dangerous difficulty in relating to women.

Mal turns his obsessive attentions to the fictitious "Rebecca", and not only sends a letter but tracks down the telephone number of "her" address. He calls and speaks to one of the old ladies, who impishly accepts a date with him at a local bar. In a spirit of fun, the four ladies wait at the bar to see what Mal looks like; however, when he arrives he mistakes a hooker, Brenda (Barbara Davis) for "Rebecca", and leaves with her. When they arrive at Brenda's apartment and she asks for money, an outraged Mal attacks and kills her.

Once the ladies realize their actions have led to murder, they go to the police; however, they also investigate Mal themselves, which places them in grave danger...

Brief continuation in a similar form
On December 16, 1972, 13 months after the ABC broadcast of Do Not Fold, Spindle or Mutilate on November 9, 1971, NBC reunited Hayes and Natwick in The Snoop Sisters, a two-hour television film about two aged sisters who write mysteries as well as solve crimes.

Although different characters than in Do Not Fold, the Snoop sisters' relationship clearly resembles that of the one adventurous / one sensible style of Do Not Folds Helen Hayes and Myrna Loy, but with Natwick now cast as the level-headed sibling. Four additional 90-minute episodes of The Snoop Sisters were broadcast between December 1973 and March 1974.

Cast

 Helen Hayes as Sophie Tate Curtis
 Vince Edwards as Mal Weston
 Myrna Loy as Evelyn Tryon
 Mildred Natwick as Shelby Saunders
 Sylvia Sidney as Elizabeth Gibson
 John Beradino as Detective Hallum
 Larry D. Mann as Police Sergeant Lutz
 Barbara Davis as Brenda
 Paul Smith as Cutter
 Gary Vinson as Jonas
 Diane Shalet as Ruth Mellon
 Dodo Denney as Trudy
 Patrecia Wynand as Hostess
 Leonidas Ossetynski as Florist
 John Mitchum as Mr. Tubbs
 Margaret Wheeler as Mrs. Mellon
 Joe Haworth as Detective
 William Sumper as Man in Handcuffs

Reception
In the 1989 edition of Leonard Maltin's TV Movies & Video Guide, the film was rated "Average", with the comment that the "way in which prank turns frightening could've been handled far, far better; otherwise, good performances." Steven H. Scheuer's Movies on TV and Videocassette (1986–87 edition) gave the movie 1½ stars (out of 4), with the opening sentence stating, "[T]his all-star comedy about murder tends to be a bit coy..."

See also
 The Snoop Sisters
 List of television films produced for American Broadcasting Company

References

External links
 

Do Not Fold, Spindle or Mutilate at CampBlood Homo Horror Features 

1971 television films
1971 films
1970s mystery films
ABC Movie of the Week
American mystery films
Comedy mystery films
Films about computing
Films based on American novels
Films based on mystery novels
Films directed by Ted Post
Films scored by Jerry Goldsmith
Films set in Los Angeles
1970s American films